Caliphate (Swedish: Kalifat) is a Swedish thriller drama television series. It premiered on 12 January 2020 on Sveriges Television. It became the most-viewed series ever on SVT Play.

The story is based on the real-life case of the Bethnal Green trio, in which three teenage girls from London met jihad recruiters at their school in February 2015. The television adaptation follows multiple characters including Fatima – a Swedish Security Service agent, Pervin – a young Swedish woman lured into Syria, and Sulle – an opinionated teenager groomed by the Islamic State. The plot explores and revolves around themes such as Islamic extremism, terrorism, tensions within Islam and among Muslims, women's rights, and human rights.

All eight episodes were directed by Goran Kapetanović. Caliphate was made available globally on Netflix on 18 March 2020.

Plot 
The story starts with Pervin, a young Muslim woman from Sweden who lives under ISIS rule in Raqqa, Syria, with her Islamic State member husband Husam and their newborn daughter Latifa. Disillusioned with life in ISIS-controlled Raqqa, Pervin is looking to return to Sweden. After acquiring a cell phone from her neighbor and friend Tine (who is dragged away from Pervin's home, where she was hiding trying to escape being forced to remarry after her husband's death), she contacts Dolores, an anti-radicalization advocate in Sweden. Dolores puts Pervin in touch with Fatima, who is an agent of the Swedish Security Service. Fatima is at odds with the leadership due to some previous incident with "Lorentz". Fatima starts talking with Pervin over the phone, and tries to work her for intelligence related to a terror attack being planned in Sweden, in exchange for a safe return to Sweden for Pervin and her daughter.

Pervin tells Fatima about "Al Musafir" or the Traveler, who is in Sweden and is planning the attack. Al Musafir is Ibrahim "Ibbe" Haddad, who is working as a teacher's assistant in a high school, while recruiting others into the terror attack. He has already successfully recruited two brothers – Jacob, a former prisoner and alcoholic, and Emil, the younger, sensitive, and mentally disabled sibling. The two have a tense relationship with their mother, who clearly favors Emil and looks down on Jacob not only for his past but for his conversion to Islam. Under a different identity, Ibbe also recruits Miryam, who was raised in Baghdad, and promises her marriage in exchange for her work in his plans.

Ibbe simultaneously tries to radicalize young girls at the high school by sharing ISIS recruitment videos and propaganda. He successfully recruits Sulle, a Palestine activist, and her friend Kerima, both 15-year-old girls who start wearing the hijab and taking lessons in following Sharia law. The girls are shown pictures of palaces and told that if they moved to the Islamic Caliphate, they could live in luxury and be part of something special by marrying jihadist fighters. Sulle's parents wise up to their daughter's radicalization, and try to stop her by threatening to marry her off to a relative in Jordan. Sulle inadvertently pulls her 13-year-old sister Lisha into the Islamic extremist ideology, the implications of which are not fully realized until later in the show. At home, Kerima is physically abused by her alcoholic father, who has Post-Traumatic Stress Disorder after having fought in the Second Chechen War; stalking her, Ibbe takes Kerima into his home to indoctrinate her further.

Fatima does not reveal her source (Pervin) to her superiors, but does reveal vague details about a terror plot. Her superiors tell her to drop the investigation, and have her suspended for consuming cannabis. She remains in touch with her boyfriend, Calle, who's also in the Security Service, and continues to share information with him. She continues extracting information from Pervin and tries to piece together details of the plot. She gets on Jacob and Emil's trail when she investigates intel from Pervin about an abandoned shooting range. Jacob gets her license plate, and tracks it down.

Dolores and Ibbe are at an anti-radicalization meeting when Ibbe steps out to talk with Jacob. The host shows an ISIS video and points to a tattoo on the forearm of one of the terrorists. Later while at a cafe, Dolores sees the tattoo on Ibbe's arm. After Ibbe drops her off, she calls Fatima to tell her she has important information, who asks her to meet her at Fatima's apartment. When Dolores goes there, she is stabbed by an assailant and dies. When Fatima arrives, an alert has been issued to bring her in, and she plans to escape. She goes to Dolores's house to get some cash and supplies, but two cops also enter. She locks them in a bedroom at gun point, before escaping, and becomes the subject of a manhunt. She finds shelter at the home of her father's colleague.

Pervin becomes the focus of attention of Ahmed, one of Husam's colleagues. He arrives one night at her house and catches her talking to Fatima. He rapes her, and is about to kill her when she stabs him to death. She dumps his body in her neighbors' well. Husam is under the influence of sleeping medicines and happens to walk into the kitchen and see the blood on the floor, but Pervin convinces him that he is dreaming. He never quite forgets this and becomes convinced that he killed Ahmed, until Pervin finally tells him the truth.

Fatima seeks helps to extricate Pervin, and a plan is set to remove her from Raqqa. Meanwhile, Sulle and Kerima have plane tickets to travel to Turkey, and are picked up by Ibbe and the woman who has been teaching them about Islam. At the last minute, Sulle's younger sister Lisha joins them in the car and they set off for the airport. Sulle lied to her parents about going to a basketball game. Her father Suleiman, who voices his disdain of religion, finishes work early and decides to go and watch her game, but sees that the stadium is empty. He calls Calle, who sets off an alert with authorities in Germany and Turkey. They believe they have tracked the girls on their way to Istanbul, only to realize that their passports were switched, and that the girls were in fact in Ankara. They decide to intercept the transport vehicle at the border between Turkey and Syria. They manage to rescue everyone except for Lisha, who is en route to Syria.

Calle convinces Fatima to seek help from Pervin to save Lisha. Pervin and her daughter have reached their transport vehicle when Fatima convinces her to return home and save Lisha. In return, Fatima would personally come to Syria to rescue them all. Pervin convinces Husam to take Lisha on as his second wife.

Before leaving to carry out the attack, Jacob stabs his mother to death in their kitchen. Fatima is trailing Jacob and Emil, but loses their trail after they switch cars at their mother's house. Fatima learns of the three terror targets minutes before the police close in on her location, and she is taken into custody before she can share any information. In return for the information, she promises to extricate Husam along with Pervin and Lisha. All three terror attacks are stopped anyway by the Security Service, who, it turns out, knew about them all along. They kept Fatima in the dark because they did not trust her. In exchange for her silence, she is released from jail. Ibbe sets a bomb off within a garage, and escapes narrowly by disguising himself as a woman.

Fatima travels to Syria to rescue Pervin, Lisha, and Husam. Minutes before she arrives, Husam's colleague Omar arrives to take Husam to perform a suicide bombing. Husam tries to buy time, but Lisha who is completely radicalized (even moreso than her sister was) and unwilling to return to Sweden, reveals their escape plan to Omar. Omar shoots Pervin in the back and is about to shoot Husam, when Fatima arrives and shoots him dead. They quickly move to the car, while an insane Lisha refuses to join them so they leave her behind. They make it outside Raqqa, but Pervin dies just after the border post. A devastated Fatima helps the equally distraught Husam carries his daughter, and they make it back to Sweden.

Sulle and Kerima are interrogated by the Security Service. A regretful Sulle gives up Ibbe's identity in an effort to save her sister Lisha. Kerima tries to commit suicide, and is taken to a mental health facility where she gets her hands on a cell phone and warns Ibbe that his cover may be blown. Calle goes to the school to bring Ibbe into custody, but Ibbe escapes. Kerima meets up with Ibbe and decides to participate in a new attack on a girls' concert. Kerima is to wear a suicide vest that is locked so that she cannot remove it once she puts it on. Ibbe convinces Kerima that he and Sulle are also part of the attack, and will be wearing similar suicide vests. Once at the concert, after putting on the suicide vest, Kerima texts Sulle; only to learn that Ibbe had lied, and Sulle is not involved at all in the plan. In the concert facility toilets, Kerima briefly attempts to remove the vest, but fails; so instead warns some of the attendees in there, who flee, and waits for the bomb to explode while having a final exchange with a tearful Sulle over the phone. Ibbe triggers the bomb.

Production 
The series was produced by Filmlance (The Bridge) for Swedish broadcaster SVT, and sold by Endemol Shine International. It is based on an idea by Wilhelm Behrman, who created the series together with Nikolas Rockström. It was directed by the Guldbagge-awarded director Goran Kapetanovic.  It was shot in Stockholm and Jordan.

Cast

References

External links 
 
 
 
 

2020 Swedish television series debuts
Swedish drama television series
Sveriges Television original programming
Islamic State of Iraq and the Levant
Caliphalism
Islamism in Syria
Islam in Sweden
Islam and women
Religious drama television series